Robert Pierre Frédéric Boudrioz (12 February 1887 – 22 June 1949) was a French screenwriter and film director.

Boudrioz was born in Versailles and died in Paris.

Selected filmography
Director
 Tom Thumb (1920)
 Tillers of the Soil (1923)
 La Chaussée des géants (1925)
 Holiday (1931)
 Vacances (1933)
 Le grillon du foyer (1933)
 The Man with a Broken Ear (1934)

Bibliography
 Oscherwitz, Dayna & Higgins, MaryEllen. The A to Z of French Cinema. Scarecrow Press, 2009.
 Powrie, Phil & Rebillard, Éric. Pierre Batcheff and stardom in 1920s French cinema. Edinburgh University Press, 2009

External links

French film directors
French male screenwriters
20th-century French screenwriters
People from Versailles
1887 births
1949 deaths
20th-century French male writers